Statistics of L. League in the 1993 season. Yomiuri Nippon SC Ladies Beleza won the championship.

First stage

Second stage

Championship playoff 
 Suzuyo Shimizu FC Lovely Ladies 0-2 Yomiuri Nippon SC Ladies Beleza
Yomiuri Nippon SC Ladies Beleza won the championship.

League standings

League awards

Best player

Top scorers

Best eleven

Best young player

JLSL Challenge League

See also 
 Empress's Cup

External links 
  Nadeshiko League Official Site

Nadeshiko League seasons
L
Japan
Japan
1993 in Japanese women's sport